Noureddin Esheni Qudejani or Noureddin Qudejani Esheni (1903 – October 14, 1978) was an Iranian Shia cleric, famous preacher and orator of Isfahan, Faqih, lawyer and professor of Isfahan Seminary. He was the famous Salah al jama'ah imam of the Seyyed Mosque of Isfahan. He was one of the modernist clerics and the first cleric to study law and become a lawyer.

‌Birth 
Noureddin Esheni Qudejani was born in 1903 (1321 AH) in the village of Eshen in Najafabad County, Isfahan Province, Iran. His father was Mohammad Hossein Esheni Qudejani. He was born in the family of science, ijtihad, and the house of virtue and morality, so he was educated and guided by his parents, and the ground was laid for his progress in the later stages. Seyyed Mosleh al-Din Mahdavi (famous Iranian researcher and historian) mentions Noureddin Esheni Qudejani 's birthplace in Najaf.

Educations 
He began his education with his scientist father Mohammad Hossein Esheni Qudejani and at the same time, used the presence of great Islamic scholars of Isfahan. Among his teachers in Isfahan are the great Islamic scholars: Seyyed Mohammad Bagher Dorchehie, Sheikh Mohammad Reza Najafi, Sheikh Mohammad Hakim Khorasani. His other teacher, especially in the Islamic seminary levels and in the literature, was Jalaluddin Homaei.

Considering the years that Noureddin Esheni Qudejani was studying in Isfahan, it can be guessed that he studied under the great figures such as Mir Seyyed Ali Najafabadi and Mir Seyyed Mohammad Najafabadi and great masters such as: Rahim Arbab, Abu l-Huda Kalbasi, Seyyed Abu l-Qasim Dihkurdi Isfahani and Mir Mohammad Sadegh Khatunabadi. Noureddin Esheni Qudejani, after using the presence of Isfahan scholars, went to the seminary of Qom and studied under its famous founder, Abdul-Karim Haeri Yazdi and also studied under the great muhaddith jurist Seyyed Mohammad Hojjat Kooh Kamari. Then he went to Tehran and benefited a lot from the mystic jurist Mohammad Ali Shahabadi.

While studying in Qom, Noureddin Esheni Qudejani succeeded in obtaining permission for ijtihad from Abdul-Karim Haeri Yazdi, the document of which is available to his family.

His contemporaries 
Noureddin Esheni Qudejani has been both a period and a debate with many of the great contemporary scholars and jurists of recent times. In the lecture hall of Jalaluddin Homaei, in courses which was held in Jarchi Mosque and 70 to 80 participant from people of Isfahan regularly attended it, Noureddin Esheni Qudejani participated in it and there he discussed and exchanged ideas with scholars like Seyyed Hassan Modarres Bidabadi (a Shiite scholar), Morteza Ardakani Yazdi (a Shiite scholar) and Abbas Ali Adib Habibabadi (a Shiite jurist and belletrist).

Noureddin Esheni Qudejani was also a classmate of Mir Seyyed Hassan Modarres Hashemi Esfahani (Isfahani scholar and sage) during studying Islamic courses of Qom Seminary. Noureddin Esheni Qudejani was a classmate of Ruhollah Khomeini (the founder of the Islamic Republic of Iran) in the lessons of Mohammad Ali Shahabadi (famous mystic and jurist) and in the Qom Seminary, Noureddin Esheni Qudejani has been a roommate of him for five years.

Social careers 
Although Noureddin Esheni Qudejani had a high scientific status, he was never unaware of his social duties and his relationship with the people. He did not limit himself to teaching, but also preached Islam and lectured in public and private assemblies, and even practiced law. In general, his social activities and occupations can be divided as follows:

Sermon assembly 
Due to his mastery of Islamic jurisprudence, wisdom, hadith, theology, tafsir, and poetic and mystical taste, he had attractive pulpits and lectures, and he was a glorious orator and an eloquent preacher. He studied and researched a lot before each of his lectures and presented the scientific and jurisprudential documents. Another feature of his speeches was his outspoken opposition to the tyranny and corruption of the imperial regime of Pahlavi dynasty (the last Iranian royal dynasty, ruling for almost 54 years between 1925 and 1979). In his speeches, he publicly fought against the lack of hijab and the moral corruption and the oppression and injustice of that time, for this reason, he was summoned several times by the Isfahan Police Department.

Noureddin Esheni Qudejani 's Rawda Khwani rituals and sermons were very popular in Isfahan and people showed great interest in his speeches, so that he, at the invitation of the people and various assemblies, in the last thirty years of his life, regularly gave pulpits and speeches. At that time, several meetings were held in Isfahan on social and religious issues. In the meantime, the sermon assemblies of scholars such as Seyyed Abdul Hussein Tayyeb, Sheikh Mohammad Baqir Zand Kermani, Noureddin Esheni Qudejani and Agha Seyyed Hassan Modarres were of special importance and were more famous than the other assemblies. Noureddin Esheni Qudejani, who was a figure with extensive knowledge, held his weekly meetings mostly in the field of philosophy of Ahkam.

Islamic Youth Organization 
Noureddin Esheni Qudejani, who was known among the clergy and scholars for his enlightenment and who also studied and researched modern Western philosophy and thought, was for some time the head of the Islamic Youth Organization of Isfahan and spoke to intellectuals and modernists. A series of his articles in this regard also published in the Toofan newspaper (an analytical and critical newspaper of the Qajar period).

Teaching and students 
Noureddin Esheni Qudejani taught in various schools of Isfahan Seminary such as: Sadr Madrasa, Chaharbagh, Masjed Nov Bazaar, and in his law office and even in his personal home. He taught books such as Faraed ol-Usul (a very important book on the principles of Shiite jurisprudence), Makasib (one of the important books of the highest levels of Shiite seminaries), Kefayah al-osul (important book of Principles of Islamic jurisprudence), Manzoomeh (a philosophical book considered by Shiite scholars), Four Journeys (an extended compendium of Islamic philosophy) and some other theological and mystical texts to students and scholars. For a long time he was one of the leading teachers of Sadr school and taught books such as Manzoomeh, Qawanin al-Usul (a complete course in the science of the principles of Shiite jurisprudence) and Faraed ol-Usul there. He also had a course on interpreting the Quran for the students of Sadr school, in which a group of scholars participated. It is narrated that about three hundred of students and scholars attended Noureddin Esheni Qudejani 's classes at the Masjed Nov Bazaar. In addition, he had private students who taught at home or at work. His students were both men and women, and at the request of some religious women in Isfahan, he went to their homes and taught them. Among his prominent students, can be mentioned: Seyyed Ahmad Faqih Emami, Hossein Mazaheri, Ahmad Qominejad, Sheikh Parsa and women such as: Zīnah al-Sādāt Humāyūnī and Effat al-Zaman Amin.

Writings 
Noureddin Esheni Qudejani did not give up writing, despite his social work and the abundance of lectures and advocacy. The largest volume of his writings is about the interpretation of the Quran because he considered the knowledge of the Quran as the highest sciences and devoted his great effort, both in expression and speech and in his teaching or writings, to the interpretation of the Quran. In general, his remaining works can be divided into five general topics: 1- Interpretation, 2- Theology and ethics, 3- Wisdom and mysticism, 4- Hadith, 5- Miscellaneous topics.

Interpretations of Quran

Theology and ethics

Wisdom and mysticism

Hadith

Miscellaneous

Spouse and children 
Noureddin Esheni Qudejani from his wife Khanum Agha Kathiri had two sons named Asif and As'ad and four daughters.

Death 
Noureddin Esheni Qudejani finally died of a heart attack on October 14, 1978 (Dhu al-Qadah 12, 1398 AH), and was buried in "Kalbasi Tekyeh" (Tomb of Mirza Abolma'ali Kalbasi) in Takht-e Foulad cemetery of Isfahan next to the grave of his father.

See also 

 Mohammad Hossein Esheni Qudejani
 Hibatuddin Shahrestani
 Mirza Jawad Maleki Tabrizi
 Abdul Karim Kho'ini Zanjani
 Agha Zia ol Din Araghi
 Mohammad Jawad al-Balaghi
 Ali Asghar Mazandarani

References

External links 
 Pictures of Noureddin Esheni Qudejani

1903 births
1978 deaths
People from Najafabad
Iranian Shia clerics
Iranian Shia scholars of Islam
Burials at Takht-e Foulad